Speed-the-Plow is a 1988 play by David Mamet that is a satirical dissection of the American movie business. As stated in The Producer's Perspective, "this is a theme Mamet would revisit in his later films Wag the Dog (1997) and State and Main (2000)". As quoted in The Producer's Perspective, Jack Kroll of Newsweek described Speed-the-Plow as "another tone poem by our nation's foremost master of the language of moral epilepsy."

The play sets its context with an epigraph (not to be recited in performance) by William Makepeace Thackeray, from his novel Pendennis, contained in a frontispiece: It starts: "Which is the most reasonable, and does his duty best: he who stands aloof from the struggle of life, calmly contemplating it, or he who descends to the ground, and takes his part in the contest?" The character of Bobby Gould finds himself on both sides of this dilemma, and at times in the play he "stands aloof", and at other times he "takes part" in life's contest, with its moral strictures.

Plot summary

Act I
The play begins in the office of Bobby Gould, who has recently been promoted to head of production at a major Hollywood studio. His job is to find suitable scripts to bring to studio head Richard Ross to be made into big Hollywood movies. His longtime associate, Charlie Fox, has arrived with important news: movie star Doug Brown came to his house that morning interested in making a movie Fox had sent his way some time ago. Gould immediately arranges a meeting with Ross, wanting to deliver the news personally that such a big star, who usually works with a different studio, is keen to make a movie with them and that such a movie is sure to be a financial success.

Gould thanks Fox for bringing the project to him when he could have gone "across the street" to another studio. Fox says he is loyal to Gould on account of the many years he has worked for him. Word comes back that Ross is flying to New York City for the day, so they will have to meet with him tomorrow, which could present a problem because Brown wants an answer by 10 o'clock the next morning. Gould assures Fox that it will work out.

Fox is beside himself about the big break he has gotten, which could finally make him both rich and a player in Hollywood after years of toiling in obscurity. He requests coffee and Gould asks his secretary to get some. As they wait, Gould tells Fox about a book he has been asked to give a "courtesy read" to, meaning that it is not seriously being considered to be made into a film because the author is "an Eastern sissy writer". Gould's secretary, Karen, arrives with the coffee and the two men ebulliently chat with her about the movie business and their experiences related to it. Karen is only temporarily filling in for Gould's regular secretary and is new to Hollywood. Gould asks her to make lunch reservations for them and she leaves.

After she's gone, Fox comments on Karen, teasing him about trying to seduce her. He thinks that Karen is neither a "floozy" nor an ambitious girl trying to sleep her way up the Hollywood ladder, so it would be hard for Gould to bed her. Gould thinks he can and the two make a five hundred dollar wager to that effect. Fox leaves, soon to be seeing Gould at their lunch appointment.

Karen returns to discuss the lunch reservation. Gould asks her to sit and begins to tell her about the movie business. He tells her about the book he has been giving a "courtesy read". Uncorrupted and naïve, she asks why he is so sure there is no hope for the book. Gould offers Karen a chance to take part in the process by reading the book and delivering to him her opinion of it to him that night at his home. As she leaves, Gould asks her to tell Fox that "he owes me five hundred bucks".

Act II
That night, at Gould's apartment, Karen delivers a glowing report on the book, a story about the apocalyptic effects of radiation. As he is seducing her, Gould speaks warmly toward her, offering to bring her under his wing at the studio. Karen says she wants to work on the film adaptation of the book. Gould says that even if the book is good, it won't make a successful Hollywood movie. Karen admonishes him for simply perpetuating the standard Hollywood formula instead of taking a creative risk. When Gould protests, Karen says that she knows Gould invited her to his place in order to sleep with her and aggressively starts to seduce him into taking her to bed, and into pitching the book instead of the Doug Brown film.

Act III
The next morning Fox is back in Gould's office, excited about their upcoming meeting with Ross. Gould surprises Fox with news that instead he is going to be pitching the book, without him. The passive Fox initially takes the news with good humor, but gradually becomes more and more aggressive. He chides Gould for preparing to throw both of their careers away by pushing a movie the studio will never agree to make. Gould says that he has been awake all night and feels the call to "do something which is right". Fox suspects that Gould spent the night with Karen and that is the reason for his delirium. Gould denies this, but an increasingly enraged Fox physically attacks him and continues his verbal assault until Gould tells him to go.

Fox agrees to leave, but only after he gets the chance to ask Karen a question. Karen enters and eventually admits to being intimate with Gould the night before. Gould and Karen continue to stand together as a team until Fox gets her to admit that she would not have slept with Gould had he not agreed to green light a movie based on the book. With this, Karen's ambitious motives are revealed and Gould is in shock. She tries to hold on to the plans they had made but Fox will not allow it, telling her to leave the studio lot and never come back. As she leaves, Fox throws the book out the door after her. The play ends with Gould straightened out and ready to pitch the Doug Brown film to Ross.

Origin and meaning of the title
The Secret Middle Ages by Malcolm Jones discusses the origin of the phrase "God Speed the Plow" in a celebration known as Plow Monday and a 14th-century poem:

God spede the plow
And send us all corne enow
Our purpose for to mak
At crow of cok
Of the plwlete of Sygate
Be mery and glade
Wat Goodale this work mad

There is an 18th-century English play by Thomas Morton called Speed the Plough, which introduced the character of the prudish Mrs. Grundy.

In George Meredith's novel The Ordeal of Richard Feverel, the young protagonist, running away from home, encounters two peasants discussing their experiences, the Tinker and Speed-the-Plow. Describing them to a relative, he says, "Next, there's a tinker and a ploughman, who think that God is always fighting with the Devil which shall command the kingdoms of the earth. The tinker's for God, and the ploughman—"

In an interview in the Chicago Tribune, Mamet explained the title as follows:

Productions

Broadway
Speed-the-Plow premiered on Broadway at the Royale Theatre in a production by the Lincoln Center Theater, opening on May 3, 1988 and closing on December 31, 1988 after 279 performances. The cast featured Joe Mantegna (Gould), Ron Silver (Fox) and Madonna (Karen). The play was nominated for a Tony Award for Best Play and Best Direction of a Play (Gregory Mosher). Silver won a Tony Award for Best Actor (Play).

The first Broadway revival of Speed-the-Plow, directed by Atlantic Theatre Company artistic director Neil Pepe, began previews at the Ethel Barrymore Theatre on October 3, 2008, with an opening on October 23 in a limited engagement, closing on February 22, 2009. The cast featured Jeremy Piven as Bobby Gould, Raúl Esparza as Charlie Fox, and Elisabeth Moss as Karen. However, Piven left the production over medical issues on December 17. The role of Bobby was played by Norbert Leo Butz (from  December 23 through January 11, 2009) and William H. Macy (from January 13 through February 22, 2009).
Raul Esparza was nominated for the 2009 Tony Award for Best Performance by a Leading Actor in a Play. Reviews were positive.

Regional
It has been produced countless times in regional theaters and schools across the country.

The play was presented at the Remains Theater in 1987 starring William Peterson, the Geffen Playhouse, Los Angeles, in February and March 2007. Directed by Geffen artistic director Randall Arney, the cast starred Alicia Silverstone as Karen, Greg Germann as Charlie Fox and Jon Tenney as Bobby Gould.

London
 In 1989, it was produced at the National Theatre, directed by Gregory Mosher, with Colin Stinton, Alfred Molina and Rebecca Pidgeon.
In 2000, the play was produced at the New Ambassadors Theatre with Mark Strong, Kimberly Williams and playwright Patrick Marber in his stage debut, and then transferred to the Duke of York's Theatre with a new cast of Nathaniel Parker (Bobby Gould), Neil Morrissey (Fox) and Gina Bellman (Karen) and a new director, Rupert Goold.
 In 2008, it was revived at the Old Vic Theatre, starring artistic director Kevin Spacey as Fox, Jeff Goldblum as Gould, and Laura Michelle Kelly as Karen.
 In September 2014, it was performed in the West End at the Playhouse Theatre, and was directed by Lindsay Posner, with  Nigel Lindsay as Fox, Richard Schiff as Gould, and Lindsay Lohan as Karen. It received mixed reviews.

Sydney
In 2016, a production was produced by the Sydney Theatre Company at the Roslyn Packer Theatre. It was directed by Andrew Upton and featured Damon Herriman as Bobby, Lachy Hulme as Charlie and Rose Byrne as Karen. It ran from November 8 to December 17, 2016.

Hong Kong 
 In 2017, the production is produced by Dionysus Contemporary Theatre at the Hong Kong Academy for Performing Arts Lyric Theatre. It is directed by Olivia Yan, with the cast of Anthony Wong (Bobby Gould), Jan Lamb (Fox) and Rosa Maria Velasco (Karen), produced by Joyce Cheung. It will be the first time ever that the play has been translated into Chinese and performed in Cantonese.

Norway 
 In 2002, Speed The Plow was produced by Det Norske Teatret, Norway's leading state-funded theatre in nynorsk. It is directed by Odd Christian Hagen, with the cast of Reidar Sørensen (Bobby Gould), Nina Woxholt (Fox) and Ingrid Jørgensen (Karen). It was the first time ever that the play was translated to this language. Mamet's brother attended the opening night, bringing his brother's greetings to the cast and crew. The music was composed and performed live by Ole Kristian Wetten.

Reception 
Reviews for Madonna's acting ranged from mixed to negative. Her appearance in the play helped box-office sales; Speed-the-Plow sold a record number of advance tickets and made more than $1 million.

Related works
Bobby Gould's story is continued in Mamet's one act play Bobby Gould in Hell.

In a review of Arthur Kopit's 1989 play Bone-the-Fish, New York Times theater critic Mel Gussow wrote that it "could be regarded as Mr. Kopit's response to David Mamet's Speed-the-Plow. In fact, the plays share much more than two hyphens. Mr. Kopit asks how far a film director will go in demeaning himself in quest of work."

Mamet's short story "The Bridge", which is the basis for the novel of the same name in the play, was published in the literary magazine Granta in 1985.

David Ives' one-act play Speed the Play, first produced in 1992 by the Chicago, Illinois-based Strawdog Theatre Company, is a parody of Speed-the-Plow.

Awards and nominations

Original Broadway production

2008 Broadway Revival

References

External links

Internet Broadway Database listing, 1988 production
Internet Broadway Database listing, 2008 production

1988 plays
Plays by David Mamet
Plays set in Los Angeles